A Mission control center is an entity that manages aerospace vehicle flights.

Mission control may also refer to:
 Mission control centre (Cospas-Sarsat), clearinghouse responsible for receiving and distributing distress signals from radiobeacons
 Mission Control (album) an album by rock band The Whigs
 Mission: Control!, a 1999 album from rock band Burning Airlines
 Mission Control (video game), a 2001 educational platform game
 Mission Control, a grappling position also known as the rubber guard
 Mission Control (macOS), a feature of macOS
 Mission Control Space Services, a Canadian space technology company located in Ottawa, ON
 JDK Mission Control, an open source production time profiling and diagnostics tools suite for Java

See also 
 Flight control